Gornji Kokoti is a village in the municipality of Podgorica, Montenegro.

Demographics
According to the 2003 census, it had a population of 73.

According to the 2011 census, its population was 74.

References

Populated places in Podgorica Municipality